Life TV Media was an independent UK broadcaster who produces television content for its own channel, Life One and other broadcasters.

Channels
Life TV Media started their programming on the Sky Digital platform in October 2000, Life TV. By 2007 the company had three of its own channels, which in August 2007 they compacted into just one station, Life One, due to their EPG re-shuffle TV Media sold the Sky Digital EPG numbers of its three previous stations to the Channel Four Television Corporation so that Channel 4 could group all of their channels together in one block.

Current
Life One

Former
Life TV
Life TV +2 (Timeshifted service)
Life 24
Life Showcase TV

See also
List of ITV channels
List of British television channels

References

External links

Television production companies of the United Kingdom
Mass media companies established in 2000